Hennadiy Hryhorovych Orbu (born 23 July 1970) is a Ukrainian retired professional footballer. He made his professional debut in the Ukrainian Premier League in 1991 for Shakhtar Donetsk. He played 7 games and scored 1 goal in the UEFA Intertoto Cup 1996 for Rotor Volgograd.

Career statistics

Club

Honours
 Ukrainian Premier League runner-up: 1997, 1998, 1999, 2000, 2001.
 Russian Premier League runner-up: 1997.
 Russian Premier League bronze: 1996.
 Ukrainian Cup winner: 1995, 1997.

References

1970 births
Living people
Sportspeople from Makiivka
Ukrainian footballers
Ukraine international footballers
Russian Premier League players
FC Shakhtar Makiivka players
FC Shakhtar Donetsk players
FC Rotor Volgograd players
FC Vorskla Poltava players
FC Sokol Saratov players
Ukrainian Premier League players
Ukrainian football managers
Ukrainian expatriate football managers
Ukrainian Premier League managers
FC Daugava managers
Expatriate football managers in Latvia
FC Sevastopol managers
Association football midfielders
Ukrainian people of Romanian descent
Ukrainian expatriate sportspeople in Latvia